Juan Juárez OFM (died 1528) was a Spanish Franciscan friar and one of the Twelve Apostles of Mexico. He has been named as the first bishop within what would become the United States; he was also one of the first Spanish missionaries to set foot in Florida.

Juárez was born in Valencia sometime at the end of the 15th century. He became a member of the Province of St. Gabriel of the Franciscans and traveled to New Spain in 1524. In 1526, he was appointed guardian of the convent of Huexotcingo. He returned to Spain the same year to acquire more missionaries. In 1527, he was appointed comisario over the friars who joined the mission.

Prior to leaving Spain, he was nominated as Bishop of Florida and Rio de las Palmas—which stretched from the Atlantic Ocean to the Pánuco River—by Charles V through royal patronage, which was confirmed by the Holy See. Juárez died in 1528 following a failed attempt of the colonization of Florida.

Whether or not he was bishop upon entering Florida has been questioned; regarding Juárez's appointment as Bishop of Florida, John Gilmary Shea wrote:

In addition, Edwin Ryan said that Juárez's appointment as bishop was based upon a source that was published in 1723, which he considered to be unreliable; it was also agreed upon by historians that he did not receive episcopal consecration. Juárez was, nonetheless, mentioned as bishop-elect in several documents.

Notes

References

15th-century births
Year of birth missing
1528 deaths
Spanish Franciscans
Franciscan missionaries
16th-century Spanish people
People from Valencia